Joan Nathan is an American cookbook author and newspaper journalist. She has produced TV documentaries on the subject of Jewish cuisine. She was a co-founder of New York's Ninth Avenue Food Festival under then-Mayor Abraham Beame. The Jerusalem Post has called her the "matriarch of Jewish cooking".

Education
Joan Nathan was born in Providence, Rhode Island to Pearl (Gluck) Nathan and Ernest Nathan. After receiving a master's degree in French literature from the University of Michigan, she earned another master's degree in public administration from Harvard University's John F. Kennedy School of Government. As a newspaper food journalist she has visited, among other places, France and Brazil,  uncovering new dishes or researching Jewish cuisine.

Career

Television
She was executive producer and host of Jewish Cooking in America with Joan Nathan, a PBS series based on her cookbook, Jewish Cooking in America. The series follows Nathan as she travels across the United States, visiting the kitchens of celebrities, chefs, and other notable Jewish cooks as she explores Jewish culture and history throughout the nation. The success of the series helped Nathan earn the distinction of being called the "Jewish Julia Child" in the media. In 2000, the series was nominated for best national television food show at the James Beard Awards.

Cookbooks

Nathan has written ten cookbooks, winning numerous awards for them. Six are about Jewish cuisine and two on Israeli cuisine. Her goal is to preserve Jewish traditions by interviewing cooks and documenting their recipes and stories for posterity.

In 1985, An American Folklife Cookbook won the R.T. French Tastemaker Award (now the James Beard Award). The New American Cooking won the James Beard and IACP Awards for Food of the Americas and Best American Cookbook. She was guest curator of Food Culture USA at the 2005 Smithsonian Folklife Festival, which was based on the research for her book.

Two decades later, in 2005, Jewish Cooking in America won the Julia Child Award for Best Cookbook of the Year, and the James Beard Award (again) for Food of the Americas.  In 2017, the IACP: International Association of Culinary Professionals honored Jewish Cooking in America as a Culinary Classic.

 The Flavor of Jerusalem, Little, Brown 1975
 The Jewish Holiday Kitchen, Schocken 1979
 An American Folklife Cookbook, Schocken 1984
 The Children's Jewish Holiday Kitchen, Schocken 1988
 Jewish Cooking in America, Knopf 1994
 The Jewish Holiday Baker, Schocken 1997
 The Foods of Israel Today, Knopf 2001
 Joan Nathan's Jewish Holiday Cookbook, Schocken 2004
 The New American Cooking, Knopf 2005
 Quiches, Kugels and Couscous: My Search for Jewish Cooking in France, Knopf 2010
 King Solomon's Table: A Culinary Exploration of Jewish Cooking from Around the World, Knopf 2017
 Joan Nathan: A Life in Search of Recipes, Knopf (coming March, 2024)

Personal life

Israel
She lived in Israel for three years working for Mayor Teddy Kollek of Jerusalem.

Marriage
Nathan was married to the late Allan Gerson, an attorney; the couple has three children and two grandchildren. Nathan divides her time between Washington, D.C. and Martha's Vineyard.

Awards

 2018, Creativity Moment Award, Moment Magazine 
 2015, Grande Dame Award, Les Dames d'Escoffier International 
 2011, [with her husband, Allan] Special Recognition Award from the YIVO Institute for Jewish Research for her contribution to preserving Jewish culture 
 2008, MacDowell Fellow, the MacDowell Colony 
 2005, Silver Spoon Award, Food Arts Magazine 
 2002, Honorary doctorate from the Spertus Institute of Jewish Culture 
 2001, Inductee into James Beard Foundation's Who's Who in American Food and Beverage 
 1998, Jewish Daily Forward "Forward 50"
 1995, Golda Award, American Jewish Congress 
 1994, Jewish Cooking in America received the James Beard Award for Best American Cookbook and later, the IACP/Julia Child Cookbook of the Year Award

Guest appearances
 Good Morning, America
 The Today Show
 Live with Regis and Kathie Lee
 Food Network
 The Martha Stewart Show.
 All Things Considered and Weekend Edition

Other
In January 2009, she began choking on a piece of chicken at the Art.Food.Hope dinner in Washington, D.C. but was saved by chef Tom Colicchio, who performed the Heimlich maneuver.

References

External links

 In Successful Paris Restaurant, Jewish Roots
 A Short History of the Bagel: From Ancient Egypt to Lender's
 Sweet, Sour, Tasty: An Old Iraq New Year
 Gefilte Fish: Cooking Up a Seder Staple
 Bread of Freedom in Times of Despair
 On Martha's Vineyard, Using Scallops as Currency
 Inviting an Old Favorite to the Hanukkah Table
 A Delicacy That Is Better When It's Not Served Whole
 Of Church and Steak: Farming for the Soul
 For a Sweeter Passover, Old and New Sephardic Delights
 A Toast to a Diplomat With a Cook's Heart
 From Hungary, For Hanukkah, From Long Ago
 New Year, New Dumpling
 It's Passover, Lighten Up
 In France, It's Not All Chopped Liver
 An Old-Fashioned American Standby, Fish Sauce and All
 Kugel Unraveled
 Red, White, and Blueberry
 A Crossover Hit For a Global Star

Year of birth missing (living people)
Living people
American cookbook writers
University of Michigan College of Literature, Science, and the Arts alumni
Harvard Kennedy School alumni
American television producers
American women television producers
American food writers
Jewish American writers
Women cookbook writers
James Beard Foundation Award winners
American women non-fiction writers
21st-century American Jews
21st-century American women